A. N. Prahlada Rao (born 24 July 1953) is an Indian author and Kannada-language crossword compiler/ Constructor.

Career
A. N. Prahlada Rao was born at Abbani in the Kolar district of Karnataka, India. He started his career as a journalist and was the founder editor of Honnudi.

Rao's involvement in crossword compilation is a hobby that developed from an interest in solving both Kannada and English crosswords while a student in the mid-1970s. He joined the Karnataka Information Department in 1983 in a public relations role and it was at that time he began to compile seriously. He now works as Public Relations Officer to Minister for Social Welfare, Government of Karnataka and compiles daily puzzles, sometimes with assistance from his wife. He specialises in themed puzzles and has a particular fondness for cinema. They have appeared in daily, weekly and fortnightly publications such as Prajavani, Samyukta Karnataka, Shakthi, Mangala, Vijaya Karnataka and Ee Sanje. Now he is creating daily Crosswords for Vijaya Karnataka, Samyukta Karnataka andPrajavani (Sahapati). By the end of 2018 July he has composed 42,000 Crosswords and quiz puzzles. Compilation initially took him around two hours but he had reduced that to no more than 20 minutes.

Aside from producing crosswords, Rao also sets quizzes for several publications, drawing on the same trivia and reference books that he has amassed for his compilation efforts. The front wall of his house includes a crossword grid of black and white tiles.

He has contributed his crosswords to more than 40 Kannada periodicals in the 25 years to 2016.

Crossword books

The first volumes of Kannada crossword puzzles compiled by Rao were launched on 14 February 2008. Three of the five Kannada crossword books are based on general knowledge, one on Kannada cinema, and another one for children.

To mark the centenary of the first crossword, in 2013 Rao wrote two Kannada crossword books, titled Pada Kreede and Pada Looka. Each contained 160 crosswords.

5 More Kannada Crossword books has released on 15.01.2017, titled Padajala, Padajaga, Padaranga, Padasampada and Padavyuha. Prof. Doddarangegowda, Poet released the books.

6 One more Crossword book containg of 180 crossword published in 2021. Book has been published by Vasanta Prakashana (https://www.flipkart.com/padahaasu/p/itm9099917badc0a)

Limca Book of Record
As of 2016, Rao is noted in the Limca Book of Records for creating the greatest number of crosswords in a regional language.

Kalam Book of World Record
His name has included in Kalam Book of World Records in 2019.

ASIAN Record
A.N.Prahlada Rao's name has included in Asian Record Academy in 2021.

Other works
Bangarada Manushya (2005), a biography of Dr. Rajakumar, a popular Kannada film actor. Also translated into English as Dr. Rajkumar: The Inimitable Actor With A Golden Voice (2008).
Belliterey Belagidavaru (Gems of the Silver Screen) (2007), contains profiles of 115 film stars of Kannada cinema
Vasanta Mallika (Beginning Blossoms) (2008), a CD containing nine poems that were sung by Vasantha Shashi with music composed by Puttur Narasihma Nayak.
Nanna Daari Vibhinna Daari - Rajanikanth (2013), about the Tamil film actor Rajanikanth
Praana Padaka (2013), contains recollections of Rajakumar's wife, Parvathamma.
Jaitrayaatre, a translation into Kannada of the similarly titled book written in English by K. Jairaj, an Additional Chief Secretary in the Indian Administrative Service. It documents Jairaj's experiences as an administrator over three decades and was serialised in the Kannada daily newspaper Vijaya Karnataka.
Danivillada Dhani, a Book on B.R.Pantulu, Great Director, Produces and Actor in Kannada and Tamil, written by A.N.Prahlada Rao, published through Karnataka Chalana Chitra Academy has been released by Dr. Bharati Vishnuvardhan in November 2016 at Samsa.

In 2009, 75 books about people who had contributed to Kannada cinema were released as part of the Platinum Jubilee Kannada Cinema-75 organised by Karnataka Film Chamber of Commerce. Among those books were two by Rao, being his earlier work on Rajakumar and T. S. Karibasaiah.

A.N.Prahlada Rao has  inducted into the PR Hall of Fame, and  felicitated with prestigious PRCI awards at the 12th Global Communication Conclave held at Pune, March 2018.

References

Living people
Crossword compilers
1953 births
People from Kolar
World record holders